The women's curling at the 2007 Asian Winter Games was held from January 29 to February 1, 2007 at Changchun Municipal Skating Rink, China.

Squads

Results
All times are China Standard Time (UTC+08:00)

Preliminary

29 January, 9:30

29 January, 15:30

30 January, 9:30

30 January, 15:30

31 January, 9:30

31 January, 15:30

Final round

Semifinal
1 February, 9:00

Gold medal match
1 February, 19:30

References

Session 1
Session 2
Session 3
Session 4
Session 5
Session 6
Semifinal
Final

External links
Official website

Women